Crookwell Wind Farm, located at Crookwell west of Goulburn, New South Wales, consists of eight 600 kW wind turbines giving a total capacity of 4.8 MW. It was the first grid-connected wind farm in Australia when built by Pacific Power in 1998. It is now owned by Tilt Renewables.

The farm was the largest wind farm in Australia when built, with the energy produced bought and on-sold to customers by then energy retailer Great Southern Energy.

Crookwell 2
Phase two of the Crookwell Wind Farm, planned to have an installed capacity of 92 MW, is under construction since 2009. it was officially opened in November 2018. In 2017, a modification to the wind farm development was approved, allowing an increase in the hub height from 80m to 95m, blade size from 47 to 64m, rotor diameter from 96 to 130m and blade tip height from 128 to 160m. It is expected to generate 300 GWh of energy per year, at a corresponding capacity factor of 36%.

Operations 
First generation started in August 2018, and reached full production in December 2018. The generation table uses eljmkt nemlog to obtain generation values for each month. 

Note: Asterisk indicates power output was limited during the month.

See also

Wind power in Australia
List of wind farms in New South Wales

References

External links
Eraring Energy page on Crookwell Wind Farm

Wind farms in New South Wales